Earl of Southesk is a title in the Peerage of Scotland. It was created in 1633 for Sir David Carnegie, an Extraordinary Lord of Session. He had already been created Lord Carnegie of Kinnaird in 1616 and was made Lord Carnegie, of Kinnaird and Leuchars, at the same time he was given the earldom. These titles are also in the Peerage of Scotland. The earldom is named after the River South Esk in Angus. Carnegie's younger brother John Carnegie was given the corresponding title: earl of Northesk. The earl of Southesk also holds the Scottish feudal title of Baron of Kinnaird and is a baronet in the Baronetage of Nova Scotia. Kinnaird Castle, Brechin, has been the home of the earls of Southesk for several hundred years.

The first earl of Southesk's great-great-grandson, the fifth earl, was involved in the Jacobite rising of 1715. As a result, he was attainted by Act of Parliament and his titles and estates forfeited. The representation of the family then passed to his third cousin Sir James Carnegie, 3rd Baronet, of Pittarrow (now recognized as the de jure sixth earl of Southesk; for earlier history of the baronetcy, see below). In contrast to his cousin, he fought on the side of King George II during the Jacobite rebellion, and later purchased his cousin's forfeited estates. Carnegie also sat as a Member of Parliament for Kincardineshire. His son, the fourth baronet and de jure seventh earl, also represented this constituency in the House of Commons. His son, the fifth baronet and de jure eighth earl, briefly represented Aberdeen in Parliament. His son, the sixth baronet and de jure ninth earl, obtained a reversal of the attainder in 1855 and became the ninth earl of Southesk. Lord Southesk notably served as Lord Lieutenant of Kincardineshire. In 1869 he was created Baron Balinhard, of Farnell in the County of Forfar, in the Peerage of the United Kingdom. This title gave the earls an automatic seat in the House of Lords. His grandson, the eleventh earl, married Princess Maud, granddaughter of King Edward VII. Princess Maud and her elder sister Princess Alexandra were in special remainder to the Dukedom of Fife. On Alexandra's death in 1959, the titles passed to her nephew James Carnegie, Lord Carnegie, the only son of the eleventh earl of Southesk and Princess Maud (who died in 1945), who became the third duke. On his father's death in 1992, the Duke also succeeded as twelfth earl of Southesk. The earldom and minor titles are now subsidiary titles of the Dukedom of Fife, with the title of earl of Southesk used as a courtesy title by the duke's eldest son and heir apparent.

The Carnegie baronetcy, of Pittarrow in the County of Kincardine, was created in the Baronetage of Nova Scotia on 20 February 1663 for David Carnegie. He was the son of Hon. Sir Alexander Carnegie, fourth son of the first earl of Southesk. As mentioned above, his grandson, the third baronet, became representative of the family after his cousin's attainder in 1715.

Earls of Southesk (1633)
David Carnegie, 1st Earl of Southesk (1575–1658)
James Carnegie, 2nd Earl of Southesk (born before 1583–1669)
Robert Carnegie, 3rd Earl of Southesk (born before 1649–1688)
Charles Carnegie, 4th Earl of Southesk (1661–1699)
James Carnegie, 5th Earl of Southesk (1692–1730) (attainted 1716)
James Carnegie, de jure 6th Earl of Southesk (c. 1715–1765)
David Carnegie, de jure 7th Earl of Southesk (1753–1805) 
James Carnegie, de jure 8th Earl of Southesk (1799–1849) 
James Carnegie, 9th Earl of Southesk (1827–1905) (restored in 1855)
Charles Noel Carnegie, 10th Earl of Southesk (1854–1941)
Charles Alexander Carnegie, 11th Earl of Southesk (1893–1992)
James George Alexander Bannerman Carnegie, 3rd Duke of Fife, 12th Earl of Southesk (1929–2015)
see Duke of Fife for further holders

Carnegie baronets, of Pittarrow (1663)

Sir David Carnegie, 1st Baronet (born before 1674–1708)
Sir John Carnegie, 2nd Baronet (1673–1729)
Sir James Carnegie, 3rd Baronet (c. 1715–1765) (de jure 6th Earl of Southesk)
Sir David Carnegie, 4th Baronet (1753–1805) (de jure 7th Earl of Southesk)
Sir James Carnegie, 5th Baronet (1799–1849) (de jure 8th Earl of Southesk)
Sir James Carnegie, 6th Baronet (1827–1905) (restored as Earl of Southesk in 1855)
see above for further holders of the baronetcy

See also
Duke of Fife
Earl of Northesk
Carnegie (disambiguation)

References

Lists of Scottish people
People associated with Angus, Scotland
Earldoms in the Peerage of Scotland
Noble titles created in 1633